Ingy Hamdy El-Shamy (born ) is a retired Egyptian female volleyball player. She was part of the Egypt women's national volleyball team.

She participated in the 2003 FIVB Volleyball Women's World Cup.
On club level she played for Elshams Club, Cairo, EGY in 2003. and at the 2003 All Africa Games 2003.

References

External links
http://www.fivb.org/EN/Volleyball/Competitions/WorldCup/2003/women2/Teams/VB_Player.asp?No=14091

1986 births
Living people
Egyptian women's volleyball players
Place of birth missing (living people)